The presence of Basques in California dates back four centuries. Basque explorers arrived in what is now California in the late 16th and early 17th centuries. There is a significant presence of Basque-Americans in the Bakersfield area. Many of Bakersfield's oldest and most historic restaurants are Basque, including Woolgrowers, Noriega's, Pyrenees, Benji's, and Narducci's. Memorial Day weekend features the Kern County Basque Festival, sponsored by the Kern County Basque Club. This three-day festival features food, music, dance, and handball (pelota) games. Explorer Juan Bautista de Anza was of Basque heritage.

References

External links
San Francisco Basque Cultural Center
Basque Americans